Sulṭān Zauq Nadvī is a Bangladeshi Islamic scholar, author and the founder of Jamia Darul Ma'arif Al-Islamia. He is known mainly for his expertise in and contribution to Arabic language and literature.

Early life and education
Sultan Zauq Nadvi was born in Cox's Bazar, Bengal Presidency in 1913. He belonged to a Bengali Muslim family from Jagiraghona Mahalla, Maheshkhali, Chittagong District. His mother, Ruh Afza Begum, died during his childhood. She was the daughter of Maqbul Ahmad, a khalifa of Zafar Ahmad Usmani. Nadvi's father, Alhaj Abul Khayr, was a businessman and Sufi who had close relations with Nur Bakhsh Deobandi.

His initial studies began at his local primary school and later at the nearby Natun Bazar Jame Mosque. He then enrolled at Maheshkhali's Madrasa-e-Islamia Gorakghata where he completed his primary education. Although he studied at the Imdadia Qasimul Uloom Natun Bazar Madrasa for a short time, he was educated privately by Fazal Ahmad after. In 1369 AH (1949-1950 CE), he became a student at the Ashraful Uloom Jhapua. Azizul Haque visited the madrasa and noticed Zauq's talent, eventually inviting him to complete Dawra-e Hadith at Al Jamia Al Islamia Patiya three years later. He graduated from that madrasa in 1959 and started teaching.

He returned to education in the 1980s, completing an Alamiyat degree at the Darul Uloom Nadwatul Ulama in Lucknow, India from which he gained the title of Nadvi.

Career

Sultan Zauq started teaching in 1959 at Madrasa Rashidia in Chandanaish Upazila. In 1960 he joined Jamia Imdadia Kishoreganj. In 1962, in response to the call of Maulana Haji Yunus Saheb, he was appointed as a teacher in Al-Jamiah Al-Islamiah Patiya.

In 1965, he left Jamia Patiya for the first time in order to establish an educational institution, and with his friend scholar Kamal Uddin established a madrassa named Qasimul Uloom in Agrabad. That year, he devoted himself as a teacher at Al-Jamiatul Islamiah Azizul Uloom Babunagar in response to the call of Allama Harun Babunagari. Nadvi taught Arabic literature and Hadith at higher levels and served as a Mufti. He established an organization named Nadiatul Adab for the study of Arabic Literature. After Bangladesh's independence, he was appointed to Al-Jamiah Al-Islamiah Patiya for the second time. He taught Tahawi Sharif, Tirmidhi Sharif, Mishkat and other important books there. He sponsored the Arabic Language Department, establishing an Arabic Language Academy. At that time, a quarterly Arabic journal named As-Subhul Jadeed, was published regularly via his editing.

In 1981, he went to India to participate in its International Literary Seminar and stayed for two months in the Darul Uloom Nadwatul Ulama. In 1986, Nadvi was appointed to the trustee board of Rabeta Al-Adab al-Aslami (Universal League of Islamic Literature), and was declared chairman of Bangladesh regional office of the organization. In his invitation in 1984, Abul Hasan Ali Hasani Nadwi traveled to Bangladesh and advised him about establishing a madrassa. In 1985, Allama Zauq Nadwi left Al-Jamiah Al-Islamiah Patiya for the second time and established Jamia Darul Ma'arif Al-Islamia.

At his initiative, an international literary seminar Islamic Influences in the Languages and Literature of the Eastern Nations was held in 1994 chaired by Abul Hasan Ali Hasani Nadwi in Jamia Darul Ma'arif Al-Islamia under the management of Rabita al-Adab al-Islami. In this seminar, the best poets of the Muslim world were present.

Works
Published works:
 Al-Tareek Ilal Inshaa (সহজ আত্তরীক ইলাল ইন্‌শা)
 Tasheelul Inshaa (তাছহীলুল ইনশা)
 My Life Words (আমার জীবন কথা)

See also 
 Fazlul Hoque Amini, student of Ahmad Shafi
 Izharul Islam
 Junaid Babunagari
 Allama Shah Muhibullah Babunagari

References

External links 
 Official Website of Hifazat-E-Islam Bangladesh
 Hifazat-E-Islam Bangladesh
 Bangladesh Qawmi Madrasah Education Board
 Official Website of Darul Uloom Muinul Islam Hathazari

Living people
Deobandis
1939 births
20th-century Bengalis
21st-century Bengalis
20th-century Muslims
21st-century Muslims
People from Chittagong District
Darul Uloom Nadwatul Ulama alumni
Al Jamia Al Islamia Patiya alumni
Bangladeshi Sunni Muslim scholars of Islam
Urdu-language writers
20th-century Arabic writers
21st-century Arabic writers
Bangladeshi Arabic writers
Disciples of Abul Hasan Ali Hasani Nadwi
Bengali Muslim scholars of Islam